Shais Rishon, also known by the pen name MaNishtana, is an African-American Orthodox rabbi, activist, and writer. He has written for Tablet, Kveller, The Forward, Jewcy, and Hevria, as well as writing a semi-autobiographical novel under his pen name. In 2014, he was included in The Jewish Week's "36 Under 36", an annual list of influential Jews under age 36.

Biography 
Rishon was born February 14, 1982 in Brooklyn, New York to a Jewish  family associated with the Chabad-Lubavitch movement. According to him, his mother's ancestors have been practicing Jews since the 1780s, his father is Andrew Rison. Growing up, he felt alienated from the Jewish community due to his race and the treatment he received from other Jews. He attended James Madison High School and Brooklyn College, where he majored in English.

He began blogging about his black and Jewish identities as MaNishtana in 2009. Rishon writes about racism within the Jewish community, and has worked as a content manager for Bend The Arc, a progressive Jewish organization focused on social justice, and served as rabbi for Kehilat Ir Chadash, an Orthodox congregation in New City, New York.

In 2020, Rishon and rapper Yitz Jordan (Y-Love) announced plans to create a Jewish Community Center specifically for Jews of color. The community center would be open to all Jews, but focused on Jews of color, and would build bridges both within the Jewish community and between Jews of color and other minorities.

Works 
Ariel Samson, Freelance Rabbi was a finalist for the 2018 National Jewish Book Award's Goldberg Award for Debut Fiction. Rishon says that he hopes the semi-autobiographical novel can challenge stereotypes about Jews of Color, and make a place for them in the larger Jewish community.

He has also contributed to the Kveller Haggadah. Rishon has also dabbled in playwrighting, contributing in 2017 to The Jewish Plays Project alongside playwrights Susan Bernfield, Sarah Gancher, and MJ Kaufman.

In 2013, Rishon wrote an open letter criticizing New York State Assemblyman Dov Hikind for wearing blackface at a Purim celebration.

Personal life 
Rishon has a wife, Guliene Rollins-Rishon, and daughter, who was born in late 2013. His wife is a biracial Jew and a descendant of Rabbi Yom-Tov Lipman Heller.

In June 2021, Rishon revealed publicly via Twitter that he is  autistic.

Bibliography

Books 

 Thoughts From A Unicorn: 100% Black. 100% Jewish. 0% Safe. (2012, Hyphen Publishing)
 "Fine, thanks. How are you, Jewish?": A Stream-Of-Consciousness Stroll Through the Jew of Color Mind (2014)
 The Rishoni Illuminated Legacy Hagadah (2015)
 Ariel Samson: Freelance Rabbi (2018, Multikosheral Press)

Short stories 

 2014: "One Man’s Dystopia Is Another Man’s What?"
 2014: "The (Space)Time Of Your Life"

Poems 

 2015: "Mashiach Now?"

References

External links 
 https://manishtana.net/  (Warning: This link appears to be out of date as of 14 Aug 2022 and directs to a less-than-savory site.)

African-American Jews
African-American religious leaders
American Ashkenazi Jews
Jewish American novelists
African-American novelists
Jewish anti-racism activists
Jewish American community activists
Orthodox rabbis from New York City
Writers from Brooklyn
Brooklyn College alumni
African-American bloggers
American bloggers
Jewish bloggers
Living people
1982 births
American people of Igbo descent
African-American activists
21st-century American Jews
20th-century African-American people
Polyamorous people
Pseudonymous writers